Charles Yohane (26 August 1973 – 12 February 2022) was a Zimbabwean footballer who played as a midfielder.

Club career
Born in a Salisbury suburb as the fourth of seven kids, Yohane came through the Dynamos football academy before joining Fire Batteries. In January 1995, he moved to South Africa joining the Gordon Igesund-managed African Wanderers then returned home to Zimbabwe. He then went back to South Africa to join AmaZulu before a lengthy spell at Bidvest Wits.

International career
Yohane was a member of the Zimbabwe national team at the 2004 African Nations Cup, which finished bottom of its group in the first round of competition, thus failing to secure qualification for the quarter-finals. He also participated at the 2006 African Nations Cup, with the same outcome.

Managerial career
Yohane was a coach at the Wits University development team until its collapse in 2020 and was later coaching Leruma United FC in the ABC Motsepe League.

Death
Yohane was carjacked and shot dead, suffering a gunshot in February 2022 while in South Africa working as a delivery driver. His body was found in Mzimhlophe, Soweto, on 14 February 2022. He was 48.

References

External links
 

1973 births
2022 deaths
Sportspeople from Harare
2004 African Cup of Nations players
2006 Africa Cup of Nations players
Zimbabwean footballers
Association football midfielders
Zimbabwe international footballers
Amazulu F.C. (Zimbabwe) players
Bidvest Wits F.C. players
F.C. AK players
Zimbabwean expatriate footballers
Zimbabwean expatriate sportspeople in South Africa
Expatriate soccer players in South Africa
Male murder victims
Deaths by firearm in South Africa
People murdered in South Africa
Zimbabwean people murdered abroad
South African Premier Division players